Flax rennelli is a moth of the family Erebidae first described by Michael Fibiger in 2011. It is found on Rennell Island in the Solomon Islands.

The wingspan is 8-8.5 mm. The forewings are beige, with a brown subterminal area. The base of the costa and all of the medial area are also brown. The crosslines are light brown. The terminal line is indicated by dark-brown interveinal dots. The hindwings are light grey. The underside of the forewings is unicolorous brown and the underside of the hindwings is grey with a discal spot.

References

Micronoctuini
Moths described in 2011
Taxa named by Michael Fibiger